Spud is a 2005 novel by South African author, actor, playwright and producer, John van de Ruit. A comedic sometimes sad yet straight forward novel that captures the humor of life in boarding school, through the diary of John 'Spud' Milton. The book is written in the style of a diary. The story begins on the morning of Spud's first day at a private boarding school, following his year and experiences with the often eccentric characters found in the school environment. The diary also follows Spud's family life.

A sequel, titled Spud: The Madness Continues, was released in mid-2007. It details Spud's second year of boarding school and trip to England paid by Wombat, his crazy grandmother.

In June 2009, the third book in the Spud series was released. Titled Spud: Learning to Fly. This book details Spud's third year at a school based on Michaelhouse, where he is now back at school and Pike returns for Post-Matric years and is a prefect. Pike being made a prefect means the Crazy Eight are vulnerable and cannot do anything without getting in trouble.

The fourth and final book in the series, detailing Spud's Matric year, was released August 2012, under the title "Spud: Exit, Pursued by a Bear."

After commercial success in South Africa (it won the 2006 Booksellers award), the United States saw a release of this book 2007. It is now available in North America.

Characters
Crazy Eight

The Crazy Eight consists of the eight boys in Spud's year and house at school.  
John 'Spud' Milton - (nicknamed  “Spud” by his housemates because he is a Late bloomer). The protagonist. Possessing a dry sense of humour and acid wit, Spud often writes of his discontent for his life, due to the major embarrassment he gets from having deranged parents, a senile grandmother and being part of one of the most notorious gangs in the school. Frequent topics of complaint are his , his low self-esteem and various personal matters, such as his shaky relationship with his girlfriend, Mermaid. Being surrounded by madness often makes him question his own sanity. Spud also writes of his acting aspirations, and has two major school plays – Oliver! and A Midsummer Night's Dream, as well as a humiliating house play, and having directed a fourth. Due to his parents' difficult financial situation, he got into the school through a scholarship.

 Robert 'Rambo' Black - The (self-appointed and self-nicknamed) leader of the Crazy Eight. He is known for having a public affair with Eve, the drama teacher and wife of his housemaster, and his exceptionally brutal ways. He is described as being very muscular and has black hair. In his third year, he realises he needs to be sneakier to avoid being suspended or kicked out of school, and is seen to threaten the second years with punishment if they make any attempts at initiating the first years. 

 Charlie 'Mad Dog' Hooper – A fierce and ruthless thug-like boy so named because of his hunting habits. A talented cricket bowler (has no co-ordination for batting) due to his scare tactics and high speed bowling, he appears to view Spud as a close friend, as he often includes him in hunting trips and forces him to hike with him a lot of the time, although Spud often expresses fear of him. In several entries, he cries at the idea of never seeing Spud again. In the second book, he spends a lot of time on the phone with Spud when he is expelled. Based on what Spud writes of him, he can scare anyone into submission simply by wielding his knife, and it is mentioned at some point that he has Dyslexia. After the gang visit his farm in Learning to Fly, Spud never mentions him again.

 Henry "Gecko" Barker – Spud's sickly but smart best friend. He is often sick or injured and sent to the sanitorium. Spud describes him as a thin and extremely pale boy, at one point commenting that "there have to be healthier looking corpses." He passes away towards the end of the original novel, after contracting cerebral malaria while on holiday in Mozambique. In later years, Spud occasionally reflects on Gecko's introverted and often insightful personality in later books, often around the anniversaries of his death.

 Alan "Boggo" Greenstein – a very perverted boy with a bad case of acne. Although Spud expresses open contempt for his pick-up abilities, he is still very successful with girls and, Spud occasionally mentions several relationships that Boggo is in. A frequent topic of humour in Spud's diaries is his being caught masturbating, and having to endure the school's notorious humiliation policy whenever he enters the dining hall. He is close friends with Fatty, and somewhat friendly with Rambo, as Spud often writes of comments he makes to this effect. He does not bully people like Rambo and Mad Dog, who are very physical with their bullying, but more verbally. He is actually quite intelligent and this is evident throughout the series with his witty comebacks and one-liners, and his clever money-making schemes which, to Spud's surprise, often work. 

 Vern "Rain Man" Blackadder - Spud's deranged cubicle mate, who has a strange relationship with his housemaster's cat. His bizarre behaviour leads Spud to wonder if he is surrounded by madness (as he already has deranged parents and a senile grandmother), and wonders if being surrounded by madness is an indication of becoming mad. Spud at one point writes that he may have become deranged because his father died when he was young. Although Spud finds him annoying, he nevertheless grows to respect him after he punches the school bully, Leonard Pike, in the face.

 Simon Brown - an exceptional sports star with braces, about whom Spud expresses intense dislike because of his arrogance and short-temperedness. He is absent for a significant portion of Learning to Fly, and when he returns, Simon's excuse is that he had feigned a nervous breakdown in order to play in an English cricket league, though Spud is convinced that his nervous breakdown was genuine. At the end of his third year, he becomes Head of House (which Rambo says he had deliberately avoided due to the responsibilities required).

 Sidney "Fatty" Smitherson-Scott – an obese boy who eats almost anything (once an old rugby boot) and is one of Spud's friends in the series. He is also an eating champion and local celebrity, having won several eating competitions. According to Spud, he got his nickname from Head of House 'PJ' Luthuli, who had a lisp and couldn't pronounce the name "Sidney Smitherson-Scott." Fatty, due to his weight, struggles with a lack of attention from girls, although he finally forms a relationship near the end of Learning to Fly, with a 13-year-old girl named Penny, for which he receives a lot of stick from his peers. Although he starts to diet extensively while in a relationship with Penny, she eventually breaks up with him, and he reverts to his gluttonous ways.

Alexander Short – Replaces Gecko in Madness Continues. He is forced to leave the school, fairly early on after it emerges that his dad has been breaking the law. Spud develops an intense dislike of him, both because he is rude, arrogant and unfriendly, and because he is replacing Gecko, which Spud sees as a personal affront to him.

 Roger the Cat – After Alexander Short leaves the school, the Crazy Eight decide to add Vern's beloved cat to the team. The cat, very much like Vern, exhibits traits of madness. In Exit, Pursued by a Bear, Spud writes that he has been banished to Sparerib's brother's farm, to Vern's distress.

Garth Garlic – a Malawian student who replaces Mad Dog. Fatty often relies on him for chocolate, since his father is the managing director of Nestlé Malawi. Spud often writes of the insufferable Garlic's incessant talking (specifically about Malawi), and how he persists with it even after being advised by Spud to keep quiet (Spud claims he has 'verbal diarrhea'). Nevertheless, Spud finds him becoming a friend. Garlic took the Crazy Eight on a trip with him to Lake Malawi near the end of 'Exit, Pursued by a Bear.'

Girls
 Debbie or "the Mermaid" - Spud's first girlfriend and first love. She is described as being very beautiful with blonde hair and big green eyes, hence her nickname. In the first book Spud writes of her growing depression after her father moves out. She is very fickle and has little respect for Spud's heart, twice breaking up with him on Valentine's Day - the first time after having won a beauty competition and finding a more attractive boyfriend, and the second time to become a born-again Christian and establish a close relationship with a 29-year-old cricket umpire named Gavin. These events are a frequent topic that Spud writes about in his diary, and although it appears that he lacks the self-esteem to confront her about this, he eventually finds the strength in the third book, firmly telling her that "I don't think we can be friends anymore," although this incident brings her out in tears. Despite these breakups, she continues to hold feelings for him, and he frequently writes of their strained interaction. Their relationship eventually reignites permanently after she breaks up with Gavin in Exit, Pursued by a Bear, and she becomes Spud's date to Matric Dance. Despite their continued relationship, her poor alcohol tolerance prevents them from engaging in intimacy, which becomes a source of frustration to Spud. 

 Amanda - Spud's second love. She is two years older than Spud and was cast in a leading role in the play Oliver!. Spud is enamoured by her, repeatedly describing her resemblance to actress Julia Roberts, but expresses his guilt over this, as he still loves Debbie. Spud is bemused when she refers to him as her "boy toy" in the second book, due to her being in a relationship with a second-year varsity boy. She invites him to go on vacation with her during summer holidays, but his mother does not allow him. Spud writes that she has called him a 'coward,' and a 'mother lover' for this. While at a social at Saint Joan's, Spud discovers that she is head girl of her house, and he is summoned to visit her. There, she kisses him, much to his surprise. Later, while he and the other cast members of A Midsummer Night's Dream at Wrexham College in Pietermaritzburg, she sends him a painting, painted by her father, of her in the nude, which astonishes the head teacher overseeing Spud's group. Although he considers asking her to be his Matric Dance date, Spud appears to have severed all ties with her in Exit, Pursued by a Bear, after learning she had slept with Rambo on New Year's Eve, although he holds no ill feeling towards Rambo.

 Christine - a girl slightly older than Spud who is something of a slut, and who seems to have taken a shine to Spud. When she acts in the school's production of Oliver!, she makes repeated advances on Spud, and occasionally succeeds in kissing him. Despite this, Spud is disgusted and slightly disturbed by her - this is exacerbated when, while at a party at her house with Gecko (with whom she formed a relationship in order to get close to Spud), she lures him into her bedroom and forcibly tries to get him to have sex with her. Based on his writings, Spud is the only boy in the entire series who turns down her advances, despite her persistence, suggesting he may be the only boy in the series she has genuine feelings for. She continues to make advances on Spud when he goes to the Matric dance with Mermaid (Christine had gone with Boggo).

 Penny and Brenda - two thirteen-year-old girls Spud meets at Wrexham College in Learning to Fly. He first describes Brenda as "looking slightly Spanish," and says of Penny "She had that look about her that she might be stunningly beautiful in five years time." Spud writes of Penny and Fatty's developing romance over the course of his time at Wrexham, the stick he gets from his peers because of this, and his efforts to start remodelling himself to suit Penny. He later reverts to his gluttonous ways after the two eventually break up in Exit, Pursued by a Bear. Brenda, Penny's best friend, has an obvious crush on Spud, but he has no interest in her at all.

 Sarah Silver - a pretty young girl Spud kissed at a social in Exit, Pursued by a Bear. After the social, she continues to stalk him through many letters and telephone calls, which he ignores, having been freaked out by her mildly disturbing personality and perverse sense of humour.

 Leanne - an attractive girl Spud briefly hooks up with at a hotel while holidaying with his parents. Although they don't meet again, Spud remembers his time with her fondly, and it gives him enough of a confidence boost to get back together with the Mermaid, and to ensure he keeps her.

Other Students
 Mbuelo Paul Johannes "PJ" Luthuli - Spud's head of house and friend. He is also the chairman of Spud's Sunday Night club, African Affairs. He is also said to have a lisp, as seen when he attempts to pronounce Fatty's real name (he promptly gives him his nickname). He leaves the school at the end of The Madness Continues.

 Julian - A very camp Matric prefect whose favourite hobby is photographing the behinds of all the first years when they are beaten by Sparerib. Spud's Head Chorister. He is also very sensitive around Spud. He leaves the school midway through The Madness Continues.
 Bert - Julian's sidekick and implied boyfriend.

 Leonard Pike - Spud's (and the Crazy Eight's) nemesis. He is often seen to be bullying most of the students, and often members of the Crazy Eight. He enjoys flashing himself to the members of the Crazy Eight, but this is often written off as being part of his behaviour. However, it is suggested that he has a homosexual crush on Spud, as he makes a sexual advance towards him at the end of the first book. He shows up in Learning to Fly and is made a prefect, much to the horror of the group, as they cannot do anything without getting into trouble because of him. After he is de-prefected midway through the year, he suspects Spud ratted on him for his possession of illicit items (Spud was actually doing some work for Viking). In his very final appearance, he corners Spud at the cricket nets and, to Spud's shock, proceeds to passionately kiss him, confirming that he has a crush on him. As Spud recovers from this turn of events, Pike walks away, with his last words to Spud simply being "Something to remember me by."

 Devries - Pike's sidekick.

 Geoff Lawson - A friend of Spud's in a different house. He went to his farm on various occasions throughout the books.

 Grant "Earthworm" Edwards - Spud's prefect, and slave master, although he is usually very kind.

Teachers
 Mr Edly, (The Guv) - English teacher and U/14A Cricket coach, has very interesting teaching methods and swears a lot. Befriends Spud, mostly due to his interest in literature, and his sharing a name with John Milton, one of his favourite poets.

 Mr John Riley Crispo - The elderly history teacher. Spud reminds Crispo of himself when he was young and takes a likeness to him. He does not teach the history syllabus as he is supposed to, but rather recounts his experiences in The Second World War. After he dies, Spud sings at his funeral.

 Mrs Wilson, (Eve) - Drama teacher. Plays Nancy the prostitute in the school play Oliver!. She cheats on her husband with Rambo. So nicknamed because "Eve came from Adam's sparerib."

 Mr Richardson (Viking) - Play director, who has directed many school plays, including Oliver! and A Midsummer Night's Dream. Referred to by Spud as "resident school Hitler," in second book. He replaces Sparerib as housemaster of Spud's house in Learning to Fly. The same book gives his first name as Victor.

 Mr Glockenshpeel, (The Glock) - Headmaster. Nicknamed because of how dangerous he can be, as well as his strange name.

 Mr Wilson (Sparerib) - Spud's housemaster. Nicknamed because he lost a shoulder to bone cancer (although the boys believed he lost it in a lion attack in the Kruger National Park). He leaves his post as housemaster after Rambo is returned to school in The Madness Continues, although he remains a teacher at the school.

 Mr Lilly - Under 14 D/E rugby coach and Spud's art teacher. His pacifism usually results in many losses for his team.

 Reverend Bishop - The deranged school chaplain. Lacks self-esteem and is incredibly gullible, as shown when he believes that Fatty has had an epiphany. This may be due to his domineering wife.

 Mr Lambert (Mongrel) - Spud's Physical Education teacher. He is a former Rhodesian Bush War veteran and harbours racial grudges, which he takes out on all the boys in his class, especially ones who are overweight. Nicknamed because according to Spud, a mongrel "best describes an animal that has no brains, no fear and no mercy." He is a temporary (and extremely brutal) substitute for Viking as head of Spud's house during Learning to Fly. Fortunately, as Spud is joining Viking's play cast, he does not experience Mongrel's regime. 

 Mr van Vuuren - Spud's implied racist Afrikaans teacher.

 Mr Norm Wade (Salamander) - Spud's implied racist English teacher in second book. Named because he has long legs and short arms. He is Spud's cricket coach in Learning to Fly and is renamed "Norm (I don't believe in spinners) Wade."

 Mr Lennox - Mr. Crispo's replacement as history teacher. After joining the school, he forms a society called "African Affairs," which discusses the political struggle in South Africa. He is forced to dismantle it in Learning To Fly after it loses all its members with the exception of Spud and Rambo.

 Mr Sykes (Psycho) - Spud's mathematics teacher.

 Mr Hall - First team rugby coach and Adventure Club teacher. He apparently once threatened the team with a revolver on his hip, according to Bert, when they played Kings College, the schools big rival.

 Mr Bosch - Spud's Geography teacher in 'Learning To Fly.' A naturalist at heart, he is said to have a beautiful wife (Boggo reporting that 'if Eve is a six and a half, [Mrs Bosch] is a nine').

Family
 Dad - an alcoholic who is also a washerman. Appears to be completely deranged and paranoid, and regularly attempts (often unsuccessfully) to hide his racist beliefs. He is usually drunk. And later buys a dog named Blacky. 

 Blacky - the new family pet, who is taught to bark at black people. Although the Dad mistreats Blacky, he genuinely loves the dog. 

 Mom - Spud's mother who is also an alcoholic in denial.  She constantly threatens to move out of the house.

 Wombat - Spud's grandma on his mother's side.  She is usually delirious, senile and also drunk. Also throughout the entire series she encourages Spud to "spread his wild oats", despite him being a 'spud'. She has an odd habit of referring to Spud as "David," and his father as "Roy."

Film adaptation

A film adaptation, directed by Donovan Marsh, was released in South Africa on 3 December 2010. 

The film stars South African-born Australian actor Troye Sivan as Spud and with John Cleese as The Guv. The film was a massive success in South Africa, topping the box office, despite the release of Harry Potter and the Deathly Hallows – Part 1 at the same time. The film was later nominated for six South African Film and Television Awards, including Best Feature Film and Best Actor in a Feature Film (Troye Sivan).

Following the success of the first film, production of a sequel, Spud: The Madness Continues, was confirmed in May 2012, for a July 2012 shoot. It was released in 2013. In 2014, a third film, Spud 3: Learning to Fly, was released on 28 November.

References

External links
 Interview of author
 South-African Blog of author
 Spud Movie Trailer
Official Spud Book Website

2005 novels
South African novels adapted into films
South African comedy novels
Fictional diaries